Bufotes pewzowi is a species of toad in the family Bufonidae. It is found in dry plains of Central Asia, the foothills and mountains of Tian Shan, Zhungar Alatau and Pamir Mountains (Kazakhstan, Kyrgyzstan, Uzbekistan, and Tajikistan), the mountains and deserts of Western China and Mongolia, and probably westward to northern Afghanistan and north to Lake Balkhash in Kazakhstan and northeast Altai Republic in Russia. The specific name pewzowi honours , a Russian geographer, cartographer, and explorer. Common names include Xinjiang toad and Pewzow's toad; when subspecies B. p. strauchi is recognized, it can be referred to as northern Xinjiang toad, while the nominotypic B. p. pewzowi then becomes southern Xinjiang toad.

Description
Bufotes pewzowi is a tetraploid species that originates from hybridization between Bufotes latastii and Bufotes perrini. Adult males measure  and adult females  in snout–vent length.

Habitat and conservation
The tadpoles develop in oases, ponds, and pools. It is a very common species that can be found in very disturbed habitat. No major threats to this species are known. It can suffer from extreme habitat modification and from collection for traditional medicine. It probably occurs in several protected areas within its range.

References

pewzowi
Amphibians of Afghanistan
Frogs of China
Fauna of Kazakhstan
Amphibians of Mongolia
Amphibians of Russia
Fauna of Tajikistan
Fauna of Uzbekistan
Amphibians described in 1898
Taxa named by Jacques von Bedriaga
Taxonomy articles created by Polbot